Kaeding is a surname. Notable people with the surname include:

Ed Kaeding (1920–2015), Canadian provincial politician
Nate Kaeding (born 1982), American football player
Warren Kaeding, Canadian provincial politician

See also
Kading (surname)
Kaede (disambiguation)